Opsarius barnoides is a fish in genus Opsarius of the family Cyprinidae. It is found in Myanmar and China.

References 

Opsarius
Fish of Myanmar
Freshwater fish of China
Fish described in 1890